Brunswick House First Nation is an Ojibway-Cree First Nations in the Canadian province of Ontario, located in the Sudbury District,  northeast of Sault Ste Marie, Ontario. The First Nation have reserved for themselves the  Mountbatten 76A Indian Reserve and the  Duck Lake 76B Indian Reserve.  As of June, 2008, it had a registered population of 639 people, of which their on-Reserve population was 171 people.

Brunswick House is policed by the Nishnawbe-Aski Police Service, an Aboriginal-based service.

Background
Originally known as the New Brunswick House Band of Ojibway, the Ojibway people who during the fur trade era traded primarily at the New Brunswick House posts at Brunswick Lake and Missinaibi Lake became a signatory to Treaty 9.
Originally, the Band had reserved for themselves the  New Brunswick House 76 Indian Reserve, but on June 1, 1925, the Ontario government established the Chapleau Game Preserve which surrounded (and did not explicitly exclude) the New Brunswick House reserve and was closed to all hunting and trapping. The Ontario government subsequently purchased reserve land from the federal government in 1928. In 1947, the federal government purchased a tract of land in Mountbatten Township from the Ontario government and established the Mountbatten 76A Indian Reserve. The Band moved to its present reserve at Duck Lake 76B Indian Reserve after  of the Mountbatten 76A were exchanged in 1973 for an equivalent area of land closer to Chapleau, Ontario.

Governance
Brunswick House First Nation elects their leaders through the Act Electoral System, consisting of a Chief and six Councillors.  The current Chief is Cheryl St. Denis. Together with Councillors Kevin Tangie, Christine Venedam, Andrew Neshawabin, Gisele Noel, Renae VanBuskirk, and Kevin Lacroix.

Brunswick House First Nation is a member of the Wabun Tribal Council, a Regional Chiefs' Council, which in turn is member of the Nishnawbe Aski Nation, a Tribal Political Organization.

External links
Brunswick House First Nation
NAN profile for Brunswick House
AANDC profile for Brunswick House

Communities in Sudbury District
Nishnawbe Aski Nation
Hudson's Bay Company trading posts